Mabel Woodward may refer to:
 Mabel May Woodward (1877–1945), Rhode Island impressionist painter
 Mabel Strickland Woodward (1897–1976), rodeo performer